Khalid Mohamed is an Indian journalist, editor, film critic, screenwriter and film director. He formerly worked for the Hindustan Times and was the lead editor for Filmfare magazine. He is the son of Hindi film actress Zubeida Begum, on whose life he wrote the screenplay of Shyam Benegal's 2001 film, Zubeidaa.

An alumnus of Cathedral and John Connon School Fort, Mumbai, Mohamed has directed four Hindi films. He was hired by the Hindustan Times where he served as the national cultural editor as well as the editor of the supplement HT Cafe. He left the Times in January 2009. Mohamed has only given a few films a 5-star rating. These include Satya (1998) and Slumdog Millionaire (2008).

Mohamed has written several articles for The Wire, Firstpost, and DNA India. He's also written scripts for three of Shyam Benegal's films -- Mammo, Sardari Begum and Zubeida. Mohamed later went on to make a documentary on Shyam Benegal, "The Master". Mohamed also wrote the play, "Kennedy Bridge".

Filmography

As director and screenwriter 
 Silsiilay, 2005
 Tehzeeb, script adapted from Ingmar Bergman's Autumn Sonata (1978)
 Tareekh, 2003
 Fiza, 2000

As screenwriter 
 Zubeidaa, 2001
 Sardari Begum, 1996
 Mammo, 1994

As writer and reporter
 To Be Or Not To Be: Amitabh Bachchan, a biography of Bollywood superstar Amitabh Bachchan
 
 The Hit Girl, biography of veteran actress Asha Parekh.
The Aladia Sisters, the story of six sisters of a patriarchal Muslim family

References

External links 
 
https://www.ombooksinternational.com/view_product.php?author=51

Hindi-language film directors
Indian film critics
Indian male screenwriters
Living people
Film directors from Mumbai
Cathedral and John Connon School alumni
21st-century Indian film directors
Year of birth missing (living people)